MacArthur Stadium was a stadium in Syracuse, New York. Opened in 1934 as Municipal Stadium, it was used primarily for baseball and was the home of Syracuse Chiefs before they moved to P&C Stadium, (now NBT Bank Stadium) in 1997. The ballpark had an initial capacity of 8,416 people; its capacity was increased to 10,006 before it was renamed in honor of General Douglas MacArthur in 1942. The stadium was razed in 1997 to provide a parking lot for the newly built P&C Stadium (now named NBT Bank Stadium).

Center field 

Football 
In 1936, Municipal Stadium was the home field of the Syracuse Braves of the American Football League.

Fire 
MacArthur Stadium was severely damaged by a spectacular fire (arson) on May 14, 1969, where the center portion of the grandstand, the main entrance, press box, offices and concession area all burned, while portions of the seating overlooking left and right field were saved. The Chiefs were forced to play some home games in Oneonta and Auburn, NY, while repairs were being made, returning to the stadium on June 14 to a now wide-open gap behind home plate where the grandstand had been. (Management of the Rochester Red Wings rejected an urgent plea from Syracuse team management to move some home games to Silver Stadium). Months later it was discovered the fire had been started by some teenagers who were using a flare in an attempt to burn their way into a safe.

See also 
 Newell Park
 Star Park

References

External links
Photographs of MacArthur Stadium - Syracuse Area Ballparks
"MacArthur Stadium, Syracuse, New York," MinorLeagueBallParks.com
Sanborn map showing the ballpark, 1950

Sports venues in New York (state)
Defunct minor league baseball venues
Defunct baseball venues in the United States
Baseball venues in Syracuse, New York
American Football League (1936) venues
Syracuse Mets
American football in Syracuse, New York
1934 establishments in New York (state)
Sports venues completed in 1934
1996 disestablishments in New York (state)
Sports venues demolished in 1997
American football venues in New York (state)
Demolished sports venues in New York (state)